Wichita Lineman is the eleventh album by American singer-guitarist Glen Campbell, released in 1968 by Capitol Records.

Track listing
Side 1
 "Wichita Lineman" (Jimmy Webb) – 3:08
 "(Sittin' On) The Dock of the Bay" (Otis Redding, Steve Cropper) – 2:35
 "If You Go Away" (Jacques Brel, Rod McKuen) – 2:07
 "Ann" (Billy Ed Wheeler) – 1:56
 "Words" (Barry Gibb, Robin Gibb, Maurice Gibb) – 2:50
 "Fate of Man" (Glen Campbell) – 2:38

Side 2
 "Dreams of the Everyday Housewife" (Chris Gantry) – 2:45
 "The Straight Life" (Sonny Curtis) – 2:55
 "Reason to Believe" (Tim Hardin) – 2:20
 "You Better Sit Down Kids" (Sonny Bono) – 3:13
 "That's Not Home" (Billy Graham) – 2:35

Personnel
Music
 Glen Campbell – vocals, acoustic guitar, electric guitars
 Carol Kaye – bass guitar
 Hal Blaine – drums
 Bob Felts – drums
 Al Casey – acoustic guitar
 Dennis McCarthy – piano
 Joe Osborn – bass guitar
 Jim Gordon – drums
 Ray Pohlman – bass guitar
 Jimmy Webb – organ on "Wichita Lineman"

Production
 Al De Lory – producer, arranger

Charts
Album – Billboard (United States)

Singles – Billboard (United States)

Awards
At the 1968 11th Annual Grammy Awards, Wichita Lineman won Best Engineered Recording (Non-Classical) for Hugh Davies & Joe Polito, engineers. 
In 2000, the single Wichita Lineman was inducted into the Grammy Hall of Fame.

References

Glen Campbell albums
1968 albums
Capitol Records albums
Albums recorded at Capitol Studios